Alenka Hubacek (born 24 November 1990) is an Australian former professional tennis player.

Hubacek has a career-high WTA rankings of 460 in singles, achieved on 8 February 2010, and 274 in doubles, set on 27 September 2010. On the ITF Circuit, she won four doubles titles in her career.

Hubacek made her Grand Slam main-draw debut at the 2008 Australian Open, in the doubles tournament partnering Tyra Calderwood.

ITF finals

Doubles: 12 (4–8)

References

External links
 
 
 
 

1990 births
Living people
Australian female tennis players
Tennis people from Victoria (Australia)
Australian people of Czech descent
21st-century Australian women